El Llano Municipality may refer to:
El Llano Municipality, Aguascalientes, Mexico
El Llano, Elías Piña, Dominican Republic

Municipality name disambiguation pages